Oxyaciura tibialis is a species of tephritid or fruit flies in the genus Oxyaciura of the family Tephritidae.

Distribution
Europe & North Africa to Kazakhstan, Afghanistan & Ethiopia.

References

Tephritinae
Insects described in 1830
Diptera of Africa
Diptera of Europe
Diptera of Asia